Zebrafish (Danio rerio) is a small freshwater fish commonly used as a model organism.

Zebrafish may also refer to:

Zebrafish (journal), an academic journal focusing on research using Danio rerio and related species
Zebrafish Information Network, a biological database of information on Danio rerio
Logperch (some species of Percina), a group of North American freshwater fish also known as zebrafish
Pterois, a genus of venomous lionfish, also known as zebrafish
Red lionfish (Pterois volitans), an Australian coral reef fish also known as a zebrafish
Girella zebra, Australian fish also known as zebrafish

See also
Maylandia, a genus of cichlids